Tiffiny Mitchell is an American politician who served as a member of the Oregon House of Representatives from the 32nd district, which includes Astoria, Oregon.

Education 
Mitchell earned a Bachelor of Arts degree in Film Studies from the University of Utah and a Master of Arts in Business Administration from Western Governors University. She earned a paralegal certificate from Penn Foster College.

Career 
Prior to entering politics, Mitchell worked in the unemployment insurance unit of Utah Department of Workforce Services. She then moved to Oregon, where she worked for the Clatsop Circuit Court and Oregon Department of Human Services. Mitchell was elected on the November 6, 2018 election, succeeding Deborah Boone. She took office in 2019. In December 2019, Mitchell faced an unsuccessful recall after her vote on greenhouse gas emissions. On March 11, 2020, Mitchell announced that she would not seek re-election in 2020.

Recall attempt 
In late 2019, #TimberUnity, a Timber industry activist group, attempted to recall Mitchell. The effort failed to acquire 4,883 signatures for ballot access.

References 

Women state legislators in Oregon
Democratic Party members of the Oregon House of Representatives
Living people
Year of birth missing (living people)
University of Utah alumni
Western Governors University alumni
21st-century American women